Prince Frederik of Hesse, Landgrave Friedrich of Hesse-Cassel (24 May 1771 – 24 February 1845) was a Danish-German nobleman, Fieldmarshal and Governor-general of Norway (1810–1813) and the same in the duchies of Schleswig and Holstein (1836–1842).

Early life
He was born at Gottorp as a son of Landgrave Charles of Hesse-Kassel and Princess Louise of Denmark, who was herself the daughter of Frederick V of Denmark.

Marriage
Prince Frederik married German noblewoman Clarelia Dorothea Klara von Brockdorff (divorced Baroness von Liliencron) (born in Rohlstorf, 16 January 1778, died in Rendsburg 24 August 1836) in Norway on 21 May 1813. She was the only daughter of Detlev von Brockdorff (1709-1790) and his second wife, Henriette Friederike von Blome (1735-1818), who was also his first cousin once removed. Because her family didn't belong to the small circle of ruling sovereign families, the marriage was a morganatic one, she could not share her husband's rank and title. This meant that she was not allowed to use the title of Princess of Hesse. 

Children

In 1803, Prince Frederik had a son with his mistress, Johanne Jansen. The son was named Christian Friederichsen (23 November 1803 in Moldened near the city of Schleswig - 29 August 1866 in Copenhagen, Denmark). By patent of 23 October 1819, Friederichsen was admitted to the Danish nobility with the name Løvenfeldt (Lovenfeldt) with seniority from 11 July 1815. He became major in the army and a royal Chamberlain.

Career
Frederick was a close relative of the Dano-Norwegian royal family, and had a military career from a very young age. He became Colonel already in 1778, Major General in 1783 and Lieutenant General in 1789. He headed the King's Regiment from 1795 to 1800, and from 1800 to 1808 Prince Frederick was governor in Rendsborg and Inspector-General for the footmen in the duchies of Schleswig and Holstein. In 1808 he was made General in the infantry. The following year, he was appointed to lead a Danish army from Zealand to Scania, as a part of the Dano-Swedish War. The campaign was dropped by the Danish government.

In July 1809 the prince was sent to serve in Norway. The reason was that the Governor-General, Duke Christian August of Schleswig-Holstein-Sonderburg-Augustenburg was suspected to drop his loyalty to King Frederick VI in order to be adopted as the Swedish throne heir. Frederick was the commanding general in the southern part of the country. Christian August left Norway for Sweden on 7 January 1810, and Frederick became Vice Governor-General on 9 January. Frederick was an active Governor-General. During his period in Norway, he also served as praeses of the Royal Norwegian Society for Development. However, King Frederick VI eventually felt the need to replace him with his heir, Crown Prince Christian Frederick, who assumed office on 23 May 1813. Around this time, Frederick also parted ways with his longtime aide-de-camp, Hans Henrik Rode.

In 1813–1814, the prince led the Danish Auxiliary Corps in Holstein. This was during the War of the Sixth Coalition, in which Denmark-Norway fought on the French side. The main task for his corps was to assist the forces of Louis-Nicolas Davout. When France suffered a loss at the Battle of Leipzig, Frederick's corps had to retreat, and in December 1813 he led his troops from Rostock to Rendsborg, saving the army from annihilation. He even led his troops to a victory in the Battle of Sehested on 10 December 1813. He then planned an attack on the Russian and Swedish occupational forces in Holstein. This attack was abandoned after the peace settlement between Sweden and Denmark-Norway, the Treaty of Kiel of 14 January 1814.

From 1815 to 1818, the prince led the Danish occupational forces in France. After returning home, he was once again made commanding general in Schleswig and Holstein, and governor of Rendsborg. From 1836 to 1842 he served as Governor-General over Schleswig and Holstein, succeeding his late father Charles. Frederick was also promoted to field marshal. He had been decorated with the Order of the Elephant in 1801 and became a Grand Commander of the Order of the Dannebrog after his success in 1813. Prince Frederick spent his last years at the family estate Panker by the Baltic Sea. He died here in February 1845.

Ancestry

References

External links 

1771 births
1845 deaths
House of Hesse-Kassel
Governors-general of Norway
Danish generals
Danish military commanders of the Napoleonic Wars
Danish military personnel of the Napoleonic Wars
Grand Commanders of the Order of the Dannebrog